Palmetto State E-cademy was a full-time virtual public charter school in the South Carolina Public Charter School District. It served students throughout the state in grades 9–12 from 2008 until 2014. The office of Palmetto State E-cademy was located in Columbia, South Carolina.

References

External links
 Palmetto State E-cademy website
 South Carolina Public Charter School District

Education in South Carolina